The eastern crested loach (Paracobitis longicauda) is a species of stone loach native to Central Asia. This species grows to a length of  TL.

References 
 

Nemacheilidae
Taxa named by Karl Kessler 
Fish described in 1872